Bairadvalley Bakhasar is  a village in the Barmer district of the Rajasthan state in India not far from the border. Thakur Balwant Singh Bakhasar was the feudal of Bakhasar who turned a dacoit later allegedly for his honour.

References 

Villages in Barmer district

बाङमेर जिले के अतंरराष्ट्रीय सीमा से सटे बाखासर, हाथला, एकल, नवातला बाखासर, जाटों का बेरा, दीपला, जानपालिया, पांधी का निवाण, बींसासर, सारला, हरपालिया आदि इन सीमावर्ती गांवों के क्षेत्र को बैरड़वैली क्षेत्र के नाम से जाना जाता है।